This is a list of yearly Colorado Football Association standings.

Standings

References

Colorado Football Association
Standings
Colorado Football Association standings